Tynemouth was a rural district in the English county of Northumberland.

It was created by the Local Government Act 1894 based on the Tynemouth rural sanitary district. It initially contained the following parishes:

Backworth
Bebside
Burradon
Earsdon
East Hartford
Hartley
Holywell
Horton
Longbenton
Murton
Seaton Delaval
West Hartford
Willington

In 1897 the parishes of Backworth, Earsdon, Holywell and Murton became an Earsdon Urban District.  A Camperdown parish was created in 1910 from the Weetslade urban district, also taking in part of Longbenton urban district.  In 1910 Willington and part of Longbenton were added to the Municipal Borough of Wallsend.

The rural district was dissolved in 1912, being split between the Blyth, Longbenton, Whitley and Monkseaton, Seaton Delaval and Cramlington urban districts.

References
Youngs, Volume 2

Districts of England created by the Local Government Act 1894
Rural districts of England